The Administrative Department of Science, Technology and Innovation, also known as Colciencias, is a Colombian government agency that supports fundamental and applied research in Colombia.

Publindex
 
Colciencias runs Publindex, the National Abstracting and Indexing System for Serial Publications in Science, Technology and Innovation, which is a ranking of academic journals in four categories (C, B, A2, and A1).

References

Science and technology in Colombia
Scientific organisations based in Colombia
National Planning Department (Colombia)
Government agencies established in 2009
2009 establishments in Colombia